Abraham Oakey Hall (July 26, 1826 – October 7, 1898) was an American politician, lawyer, and writer. He served as Mayor of New York from 1869 to 1872 as a Democrat. Hall, known as "Elegant Oakey", was a model of serenity and respectability. Recent historians have disputed the older depiction of Hall as corrupt or as a front man for a corrupt political order.

Biography

Early life
Hall was born in Albany, New York. His childhood was marked by poverty after the death of his father, a New York merchant, when Hall was 3 years old. In 1840, he entered New York University, and wrote for many newspapers to pay his way through school. He graduated in 1844 with bachelor's and master's degrees. He attended Harvard Law School until 1845 before dropping out to apprentice to finish his legal education. Hall returned to New York in 1845, and worked in the law office of Charles W. Sandford. In 1846, he moved to New Orleans where he apprenticed at the law firm of Thomas & John Slidell.

During this period, using the pen name of Hans Yorkel, he served as the New York correspondent of the New Orleans Commercial Bulletin. He returned to New York, where he practiced law and was admitted to the bar in 1851. In that year, Hall authored a book, The Manhattaner in New Orleans, or, Phases of "Crescent City" Life, in which he addressed the problems and challenges of large, ethnically diverse port cities and provided important historical sketches of a young New Orleans. In 1857, he authored a formerly popular Christmas poem and song, "Old Whitey's Christmas Trot".

Political career
In 1851, New York County District Attorney N. Bowditch Blunt appointed Hall as an assistant district attorney, and after Blunt's death in 1854, Hall offered to occupy the office until the end of the year and revert the district attorney's wages to Blunt's widow and her eight children. However, Democrat Lorenzo B. Shepard was appointed by Governor Horatio Seymour to fill the vacancy. In November 1854, Hall was elected on the Whig ticket to succeed Shepard, and served his first term as New York County District Attorney from 1855 to 1857. He was not re-elected partly due to his unpopularity following the Burdell-Cunningham murder trial. As a Republican, Hall was elected again as the New York County District Attorney in November 1861, and re-elected as a Democratic Tammany Hall candidate in 1864 and 1867. In November 1868, during his fourth term as D.A., Hall was elected Mayor of New York City as a Democrat supported by Tammany Hall. He was re-elected mayor in 1870, again on the Tammany ticket, serving two terms from January 1, 1869, to December 31, 1872.

As mayor, Hall was unpopular for a myriad of reasons, partly due to the ongoing political clashes between Anglo "Nativists" and the Irish population. While Democrat "Boss" Tweed, Tammany Hall leaders and Hall were Anglo, their power base rested largely upon Irish immigrants. This conflict boiled over in 1871 when Hall attempted to stop the Irish Orange Order (Irish of Anglo-Saxon and Scots-Irish descent) from holding a parade, perhaps provocatively celebrating the historic Orangemen (Anglo Protestant Irish) victory over ethnic Irish Catholics. Fearing that either banning the march or allowing it to continue would both lead to violence and mayhem, Governor John Hoffman overruled Mayor Hall and allowed it to continue with increased policing. Nevertheless, riots did occur, cementing Hall's negative image on both sides and severely compromising Hoffman's political career.

Additionally, Hall backed away from supporting Republican candidates because of widespread dislike of the Nativists within the Party. He was seen as attempting to have it both ways rather than finding a middle ground. In particular, Thomas Nast, who had old-line Republican leanings, took aim at "Elegant Oakey" whom he considered to be the worst of the Tweed politicians because of his high standing, education and open presidential ambitions. Nast also felt that Hall got off lightly in the affair because of his continued personal connections with reformer and prosecutor Samuel Tilden, though later historians have shown that Hall and Tilden were never very close in the 1860s and 1870s and that Hall did not receive any special assistance. In fact, Tilden was the chief opponent of Tweed, Hall, et al. Hall was tried three times and finally acquitted of all charges on the third trial.

A 1993 survey of historians, political scientists and urban experts conducted by Melvin G. Holli of the University of Illinois at Chicago ranked Hall as the sixth-worst American big-city mayor to have served between the years 1820 and 1993.

Post-mayoral career
Some time after the last trial, Hall wrote and acted in his own play entitled The Crucible, where he played the lead part, a man falsely accused of stealing. The play, which ran for two or three weeks at Abbey's Park Theatre in November 1876 was a flop. The lessee and manager, William Stuart was unable to continue in business and swiftly sold the theatre to Henry E. Abbey. Stuart, whose real name was Edmund O'Flaherty, was an adventurer and swindler and former Irish M.P. with strong links to extreme financial, judicial, and political fraud and corruption in Ireland.

Hall returned to his work as an attorney. He subsequently suffered a nervous breakdown and lived for a time in London without knowledge of having done so.

Later life
After the nervous breakdown and returning to New York, Hall traveled between London and New York, involving himself in political issues, laws, writing and business. In London he became an ardent spokesperson for municipal reform. He also was a London correspondent for the New York Herald and the Morning Journal. Hall sued Viscount Bryce for defamation of character and libel, but the case was eventually dropped. His daughter Cara de la Montagnie Hall married Rear Admiral Thomas Holdup Stevens III, but maintained her name to honor her father.

In 1894, Hall defended Emma Goldman against charges of inciting to riot in New York City. He lost the case (she was sentenced to a year in prison), but she credited him with reducing the charges against her and providing her a platform to air her anarchist views. She described him as a great champion of free speech.

Hall died of heart disease on October 7, 1898, in New York City, and was buried at Trinity Cemetery, located at 155th Street and Broadway in Manhattan. He was 72.

Notes

Further reading
 Rubbinaccio, Michael. Abraham Oakey Hall: New York's Most Elegant and Controversial Mayor (Pescara Books, 2011)
 Golway, Terry 2014 Machine Made: Tammany Hall and the Creation of Modern American Politics New York, New York

References
 The Political Graveyard
 The New York Civil List compiled by Franklin Benjamin Hough, Stephen C. Hutchins and Edgar Albert Werner (1867; p. 531)

1826 births
1898 deaths
Harvard Law School alumni
Mayors of New York City
New York County District Attorneys
Politicians from Albany, New York
New York (state) Republicans
New York (state) Whigs
19th-century American politicians
Lawyers from Albany, New York
Leaders of Tammany Hall
19th-century American lawyers